The 2011 Women's Four Nations Hockey Tournament was the first of two women's field hockey tournaments, consisting of a series of test matches. It was held in Mendoza, Argentina, from February 9 to 13, 2011, and featured four of the top nations in women's field hockey.

Competition format
The tournament featured the national teams of Australia, Germany, the United States, and the hosts, Argentina, competing in a round-robin format, with each team playing each other once. Three points will be awarded for a win, one for a draw, and none for a loss.

Officials
The following umpires were appointed by the International Hockey Federation to officiate the tournament:

 Amy Hassick (USA)
 Catalina Montesino Wenzel (CHL)
 Mercedes Sánchez (ARG)
 Gaby Schmitz (GER)
 Kylie Seymour (AUS)

Results
All times are local (Argentina Standard Time).

Preliminary round

Fixtures

Classification round

Third and fourth place

Final

Statistics

Final standings

Goalscorers

References

2011 in women's field hockey
hockey
International women's field hockey competitions hosted by Argentina
Sport in Mendoza, Argentina
February 2011 sports events in South America